Stefano Guidoni (born 27 October 1971) is an Italian former footballer who played as a forward.

Career

Early career
Born in Turin, Piedmont, Guidoni started his senior career at Serie D side Giaveno and Sparta Novara, both located in Piedmont. In 1993–94 season, he left for Lombardy side Solbiatese and played one season at Serie C2. After played 10 league matches in 1994–95 Serie C2 season, he was signed by Serie C1 side Monza. He played 56 league matches for the Lombardy side before left for Campania side Avellino in 1996–97 Serie C1. In December 1996, he was signed by Serie B side Cosenza, played 25 league matches and scored 10 goals for the southern Italy club.

Perugia
As Cosenza's financial crisis, he was transferred to Umbria side Perugia in June 1997, the last few days of the 1996–97 fiscal year, for 850 million Italian lire. He just scored 4 goals for the team that won Serie A promotion.

Guidoni left for Serie B side Reggiana in co-ownership deal in June 1998, in exchange with Gianluca Berti. But in October he was signed by Verona along with Antonio Marasco (priced Guidoni 2 billion Italian lire, purchased the 50% rights from Reggiana) He won Serie B champion with the Veneto club. In June 1999, he was bought back by Perugia.

He made his Serie A debut on 29 August 1999, the opening match of the season. He was in the starting XI and was replaced by Pierpaolo Bisoli in the 68th minutes. Perugia 1–1 draw with Parma in that match. He played his 2nd league match of the season in round 3, substituted Alessandro Melli (who scored the 3rd goal). The match Perugia won Cagliari 3–0.

Salernitana
On 1 October 1999, he was sold to Serie B side Salernitana for 2.5 billion lire. After just scored 2 goals in Serie B, in January 2001, he was loaned to Serie B rival Cosenza.

Palermo & Cosenza
In July 2001, Guidoni requested the court to void the contract with Salernitana after the club owe him salary, and he had already signed a pre-contract with Palermo. With the Sicily side, he scored 11 league goals, tied his personal record in a single Serie B season. After Maurizio Zamparini purchased Palermo in July 2002 and bought some of the players from Venezia he previous own, Guidoni became a surplus and on 13 September left for Cosenza again.

Venezia & late career
After the bankruptcy of Cosenza, he joined Serie B side Venezia but the club also went bankrupt in 2005. In February 2006, he was signed by Serie B side Cremonese and in 2006–07 season he was acquired by Ivrea.

Honours
Verona
Serie B: 1998–99

References

External links
 

Italian footballers
Serie A players
Serie B players
A.C. Monza players
U.S. Avellino 1912 players
Cosenza Calcio 1914 players
A.C. Perugia Calcio players
A.C. Reggiana 1919 players
Hellas Verona F.C. players
U.S. Salernitana 1919 players
Palermo F.C. players
Venezia F.C. players
U.S. Cremonese players
Association football forwards
Footballers from Turin
1971 births
A.S.D. SolbiaSommese Calcio players
Living people
A.S.D. Calcio Ivrea players
F.C.D. Lottogiaveno players